Dichagyris longidens is a species of moth of the family Noctuidae. It is found in North America, including Colorado, and has a wingspan of about 32 mm. On February 9, 2021, National Geographic announced that the moth was the 11,000th animal photographed by Joel Sartore for The Photo Ark, saying the photo may be the first one to capture a living representative of this species.

References

External links
Image from moth photographer's group at the Mississippi Entomological Museum

longidens
Moths described in 1890